The people of the Maghreb and the Sahara speak various dialects of Berber and Arabic and almost exclusively follow Islam. The Arabic and  Berber groups of languages are distantly related, both being members of the Afro-Asiatic family. The Sahara dialects are notably more conservative than those of coastal cities (see Tuareg languages). Over the years,
Berber peoples have been influenced by other cultures with which they came in contact: Nubians, Greeks, Phoenicians, Egyptians, Romans, Vandals, Arabs, and lately Europeans. The cultures of the Maghreb and the Sahara therefore combine indigenous Berber, Arab and elements from neighboring parts of Africa and beyond. In the Sahara, the distinction between sedentary oasis inhabitants and nomadic Bedouin and Tuareg is particularly marked.

The diverse peoples of the Sahara are usually categorized along ethno-linguistic lines. In the Maghreb, where Arab and Berber identities are often integrated, these lines can be blurred. Some Berber-speaking North Africans may identify as "Arab" depending on the social and political circumstances, although substantial numbers of Berbers (or Imazighen) have retained a distinct cultural identity which in the 20th century has been expressed as a clear ethnic identification with Berber history and language. Arabic-speaking Northwest Africans, regardless of ethnic background, often identify with Arab history and culture and may share a common vision with other Arabs. This, however, may or may not exclude pride in and identification with Berber and/or other parts of their heritage. Berber political and cultural activists for their part, often referred to as Berberists, may view all Northwest Africans as principally Berber, whether they are primarily Berber- or Arabic-speaking (see also Arabized Berber).

The Nile Valley through northern Sudan traces its origins to the ancient civilizations of Egypt and Kush. The Egyptians over the centuries have shifted their language from Egyptian to modern Egyptian Arabic, while retaining a sense of national identity that has historically set them apart from other people in the region. Most Egyptians are Sunni Muslim and a significant minority adheres to Coptic Christianity. In Nubia, straddling Egypt and Sudan, a significant population retains the ancient Nubian language but has adopted Islam. The northern part of the Sudan is home to a largely Arab Muslim population, but further down the Nile Valley, the largely non-Muslim Nilotic and Nuba peoples begin.

North Africa formerly had a large Jewish population, almost all of whom emigrated to France or Israel when the North African nations gained independence. A smaller number went to Canada.  Prior to the modern establishment of Israel, there were about 600,000-700,000 Jews in Northern Africa, including both Sfardīm (refugees from France, Spain and Portugal from the Renaissance era) as well as indigenous Mizrāḥîm. Today, fewer than fifteen thousand remain in the region—almost all in Morocco and Tunisia—and are mostly part of a French speaking urban elite. (See Jewish exodus from Arab lands.)

Algeria

Modern Algerian literature, split between Arabic and French, has been strongly influenced by the country's recent history. Famous novelists of the 20th century include Mohammed Dib, Albert Camus, and Kateb Yacine, while Assia Djebar is widely translated. Important novelists of the 1980s included Rachid Mimouni, later vice-president of Amnesty International, and Tahar Djaout, murdered by an Islamist group in 1993 for his secularist views. As early as Roman times, Apuleius, in M'Daourouch, was native to what would become Algeria.

In philosophy and the humanities, Malek Bennabi and Frantz Fanon are noted for their thoughts on decolonization, while Augustine of Hippo was born in Tagaste (about 60 miles from the present day city of Annaba), and Ibn Khaldun, though born in Tunis, wrote the Muqaddima while staying in Algeria.

Algerian culture has been strongly influenced by Islam, the main religion. The works of the Sanusi family in pre-colonial times, and of Emir Abdelkader and Sheikh Ben Badis in colonial times, are widely noted.

The Algerian musical genre best known abroad is raï, a pop-flavored, opinionated take on folk music, featuring international stars such as Khaled and Cheb Mami. However, in Algeria itself the older, highly verbal chaabi style remains more popular, with such stars as El Hadj El Anka or Dahmane El Harrachi, while the tuneful melodies of Kabyle music, exemplified by Idir, Ait Menguellet, or Lounès Matoub, have a wide audience. For more classical tastes, Andalusi music, brought from Al-Andalus by Morisco refugees, is preserved in many older coastal towns.

Egypt

Egyptian culture has six thousand years of recorded history. Ancient Egypt was among the earliest civilizations.  For millennia, Egypt maintained a strikingly complex and stable culture that influenced later cultures of Europe, the Middle East and Africa. After the Pharaonic era, Egypt itself came under the influence of Hellenism, for a time Christianity, and later, Arab and Islamic culture.  Today, many aspects of Egypt's ancient culture exist in interaction with newer elements, including the influence of modern Western culture, itself with roots in Ancient Egypt.   Egypt's capital city, Cairo, is Africa's largest city and has been renowned for centuries as a center of learning, culture and commerce.

Egypt has had a thriving media and arts industry since the late 19th century, today with more than 30 satellite channels and over 100 motion pictures produced each year. Cairo in fact has long been known as the "Hollywood of the East." To bolster its media industry further, especially with the keen competition from the Persian Gulf Arab States and Lebanon, a large media city was built. Egypt is also the only Arabic-speaking country with an opera house.

Some famous Egyptians include:
Saad Zaghlul (leader of first modern Egyptian revolution; founder of Wafd political party)
Gamal Abdel Nasser (former president and mastermind of the present republic)
Anwar Sadat (former president; winner of the Nobel Peace Prize)
Boutros Boutros-Ghali (former Secretary General of the United Nations)
Naguib Mahfouz (Nobel Prize-winning novelist)
Umm Kulthum (singer)
Omar Sharif (actor)
Ahmed Zewail (Nobel Prize-winning chemist)
Mohamed ElBaradei (Head of the International Atomic Energy Agency; 2005 Nobel Peace Prize Winner)

For more famous Egyptians, see List of Egyptians and Egyptians

Libya

Libyan culture is, to a certain extent, similar to that of its other Arab neighbour states and the Libyan people very much consider themselves as part of a wider Arab community. The primary language is a colloquial form of Arabic that is unique to the area around Libya. There seem to be two distinct dialects and a couple of village and tribal dialects. Libyan Arabs  have a heritage in the traditions of the nomadic Bedouin and associate themselves with a particular Bedouin tribe.

Family life is important for Libyan families. Most Libyans live in apartment blocks and various kinds of independent housing units depending on their income status. Most of the Arabs who have lived a nomadic lifestyle, traditionally in tents, have been settled into various towns and cities in Libya, their old way of life fading out. It is believed that there are still some who do live as they have for centuries in the desert, though no one knows their exact numbers. Most of the population are engaged in occupations in industry and services and a small percentage in agriculture.

Similar to some other countries in the Arab world, Libya can boast few theatres or art galleries. Public entertainment is almost non-existent even in the big cities. Most Libyans instead enjoy regular trips to the many beaches of the country. They also visit Libya's many beautifully preserved archeological sites, especially that of Leptis Magna which is widely considered to be one of the best preserved Roman archeological sites in the world.

The nation's capital Tripoli boasts a number of museums and archives including the National Archives, the Government Library, the Ethnographic Museum, the Archaeological Museum, the Epigraphy Museum and the Islamic Museum. The Jamahirirya museum, built in consultation with UNESCO is possibly the country's most famous and houses one of the finest collections of classical art in the Mediterranean.

There has recently been something of a revival of the arts in Libya, especially in the field of painting and private galleries are springing up to provide a showcase for new talent. Conversely, for many years there have been no public theatres and only a few cinemas showing foreign films. The tradition of folk culture is still alive and well, with troupes performing music and dance at frequent festivals, both in Libya and abroad. The main output of Libyan Television is devoted to showing various styles of traditional Libyan music. Traditional Tuareg music and dance are popular in Ghadames and the south.

 Music of Libya

Morocco

Morocco is a country of multi-ethnic groups with a culture and civilization. Through Moroccan history, Morocco hosted many people coming from both East  Arabs), South (Africans) and  Moors and Jews). All those civilizations have had some impact on the social structure of Morocco. It conceived all forms of beliefs, from paganism, Judaism, Christianity to Islam.

Each region possesses its own elements, contributing, thus, to the making of national culture and to the civilization legacy. Morocco has set among its top priorities the protection of its legacy and the preservation of its cultural identity.

Ethnically and culturally speaking, Mauritania nowadays can be considered the least Arabic among Arab countries. Most of its population are of mixed Berber and indigenous African origins.

 Cuisine of Morocco
 List of writers from Morocco
 Music of Morocco

Sudan

Music of Sudan
List of writers from Sudan
Islam in Sudan
Largest Christian denominations are the Roman Catholic Church, the Episcopal Church of the Sudan, the Presbyterian Church in the Sudan and the Coptic Orthodox Church.

Tunisia

See also:
 Islam in Tunisia
 Music of Tunisia
 Tunisian Arabic

Western Sahara

The major ethnic group in the Western Sahara is the Sahrawis, a nomadic or bedouin tribal or ethnic group, speaking the Ḥassānīya dialect of Arabic, which is also the majority dialect in Mauritania. They are of mixed Arab-Berber descent, but claim descent from the Beni Hassan, a Yemeni tribe supposed to have migrated across the desert in the 11th century.

Generally indistinguishable from the Hassaniya speaking tribes of neighboring Mauritania, Morocco and Algeria, Western Saharan Sahrawi people differ from their neighbors largely due to their exposure to Spanish colonial domination. All the surrounding territories were during the late 19th and early 20th century period of European colonial rule were generally under French colonial rule.

Like other neighboring Saharan bedouin and Hassaniya groups, the Sahrawis are Muslims of the Sunni sect and the Maliki law school. Local religious custom 'urf is, like other Saharan groups, heavily influenced by pre-Islamic Berber and African practises, and differs substantially from urban practises. For example, Sahrawi Islam has traditionally functioned without mosques in the normal sense of the word, in an adaptation to nomadic life.

The originally clan- and tribe-based society underwent a massive social change in the process of the imposition of colonial rule and subsequent upheaval in 1975, when a part of the population was fled into exile rather than pass under Moroccan rule, and settled in the refugee camps of Tindouf, Algeria, splitting up families, clans and tribes over allegiance or opposition to the imposition of Moroccan rule. For developments among this population, see Sahrawi and Tindouf Province.

Subsequent to taking effective control of the territory, the Moroccan government considerably invested in the social and economic development of the Western Sahara under its control, with special emphasis on education, modernisation and infrastructure as part of efforts to win over the population. El-Aaiun in particular has been the target of heavy government investment, and has grown rapidly. Several thousands Sahrawis study in Moroccan universities. Literacy rates are estimated at some 50% of the population. Polisario claims the refugee population in Tindouf has a literacy rate in the 90's, which would be above the verified literacy rate in the host country Algeria, recorded at roughly 86%.

To date, there have been few thorough studies of the culture due in part to the political situation. Some language and culture studies, mainly by French researchers, have been performed on Sahrawi communities in northern Mauritania.

References

External links